Tiago Ribeiro may refer to:

 Thiago Martins (footballer, born 1976), Brazilian football forward
 Thiago Martins (footballer, born 1995), Brazilian football centre-back

See also
 Tiago Martins (disambiguation)